Herbert III of Vermandois (953–1015), Count of Vermandois, was the son of Adalbert I of Vermandois and Gerberge of Lorraine.

Biography 
Two charters of the abbey of Montierender (968 and 980) attribute to Herbert III of Vermandois, then count of Chateau-Thierry, Vitry and lay abbot of the Abbey of Saint-Médard of Soissons, the title of "Count of the Franks". This title can be compared to that of Duke of the Franks worn by Robertians and that made them second in the Kingdom after the king of the Franks. Styled "Franks Count" is claiming to be the first of the counts of the Frankish king and the third place in the kingdom after the king and the duke of the Franks.

A king Lothair charter calls it "count of the palace". This title is similar to that of Count Palatine that he will after the counts of Blois and Champagne, heirs of Herbertiens.

In 990 he founded with his wife Hermengarde, the Chapter of the Collegiate Church of Saint-Florent in Roye, under the title of St. George for 25 canons.

Family
He married Hermengarde (946 – after 1035). They had:
Adalbert II, Count of Vermandois (ca. 980 – 1015)
Otto, Count of Vermandois (979 – 1045)
Simon, Lord of Ham (–after 986)

References

Sources

Herbertien dynasty
953 births
1015 deaths